Singleton is a ghost town in Winston County, Mississippi, United States.

The settlement had a post office and two churches.  The population of was 75 in 1900.

References

Former populated places in Winston County, Mississippi
Former populated places in Mississippi